Bastien Midol (born August 3, 1990) is a French freestyle skier. He has won 4 FIS World Cups and won a silver medal at the 2013 FIS Freestyle World Ski Championships.
His brother is also a medallist skier, Jonathan Midol.

Midol won the 2019 Ski Cross Crystal Globe, and came 2nd in the Overall Freestyle Rankings.

References

External links
  (freestyle)
  (alpine)
 

1990 births
Living people
French male freestyle skiers
X Games athletes
Freestyle skiers at the 2022 Winter Olympics
Olympic freestyle skiers of France